KRSN (1490 AM) is a radio station that is currently silent. Licensed to Los Alamos, New Mexico, United States, the station served the Los Alamos, Espanola and Santa Fe areas. The station is currently owned by Gillian Sutton and featured programming from CBS News Radio and Westwood One. The station was an affiliate of the syndicated Pink Floyd program "Floydian Slip."

KRSN, whose slogan is "Kommunity Radio Station Now", also streamed live on the web.

KRSN won ten New Mexico Broadcaster Association Awards including Radio Division 4 Station of the Year for 2010.

KRSN was originally KRS, which started broadcasting in February 1946. The station signed on December 9, 1949, and was licensed on January 23, 1950.

On August 11, 2020, the owners of the station, David and Gillian Sutton, announced that the station would go dark on August 30.  They cited lack of advertising and local sporting events, due to COVID-19, as the reason for shutting down.

References

External links

RSN
Radio stations established in 1949
1949 establishments in New Mexico